Taras Dolniy (born 18 June 1959) is a retired Ukrainian biathlete. He competed in the men's 20 km individual event at the 1994 Winter Olympics where he finished 12th.

References

External links
 

1959 births
Living people
Ukrainian male biathletes
Olympic biathletes of Ukraine
Biathletes at the 1994 Winter Olympics
Sportspeople from Ternopil